The Moving Toyshop (1946) is a work of detective fiction by Edmund Crispin, featuring his recurrent sleuth, Gervase Fen, an Oxford professor of English Language and Literature.

Title
The title comes from Pope's The Rape of the Lock:With varying vanities, from every part,
They shift the moving toyshop of their heart

Dedication
The novel is dedicated to the poet Philip Larkin, Crispin's contemporary at St John's College, Oxford. In chapter 10, tongue-in-cheek reference is made to Larkin, with the mention of an undergraduate essay called "The Influence of Sir Gawain on Arnold's Empedocles on Etna", about which Fen comments: "Good heavens, that must be Larkin: the most indefatigable searcher out of pointless correspondences the world has ever known."

Plot
Famous poet Richard Cadogan takes an impromptu holiday to Oxford, where he studied at the university, after growing bored with the literary life in the suburbs. After finding himself in a high street, in the middle of the night and with no place to stay, he stumbles across a shop with its awning still up. Closer inspection reveals it to be a toyshop, and on finding the door unlocked, curiosity leads Cadogan inside, then up a flight of stairs to a flat where he finds the murdered body of an elderly woman, before being knocked unconscious. He wakes up the next morning in a supply closet, but after escaping and bringing back the police, the toyshop is no longer there, replaced, it seems, with a grocer's.

Bewildered, Cadogan turns to an old friend at the University of Oxford, eccentric professor and amateur sleuth Gervase Fen, to help him solve the mystery of the moving toyshop.

Influence
The book provided the source for the famous merry-go-round sequence at the climax of Alfred Hitchcock's Strangers on a Train. All the major elements of the scene – the two men struggling, the accidentally shot attendant, the out-of-control merry-go-round, and the crawling under the moving merry-go-round to disable it – are present in Crispin's novel, though he received no screen credit for it.

Reception and legacy
In 2006, detective novelist P. D. James picked The Moving Toyshop as one of her five "most riveting crime novels". About Crispin, she said, "[He] is one of the few mystery writers able to combine situation comedy and high spirits with detection."

Other crime writers have also given praise to Crispin for the paciness and humour of his work. Scottish crime writer Val McDermid called The Moving Toyshop, ""A classic crime novel with a surreal streak… It's a clever, energetic romp, written with wit", while A. L. Kennedy described Crispin as, "One of the undiscovered treasures of British crime fiction: [his] storytelling is intelligent, humane, surprising and rattling good fun."

References

External links

1946 British novels
Novels by Edmund Crispin
Novels set in Oxford
Novels set in London
Novels set in the 1930s
J. B. Lippincott & Co. books
British mystery novels
British detective novels